Fortuné Louis Méaulle (11 April 1844, Angers – 11 May 1916) was a French wood-engraver and writer.

Biography
He apprenticed with Joseph Burn-Smeeton (fl.1840-1880), a British-born artist who worked with the French wood-engraver Auguste Tilly (1840–1898). He did not remain there long, however; being dismissed for "serious misconduct".

He then established his own studio and was one of the first artists to work with Daniel Vierge. Among his most notable illustrations are those made from pen and ink drawings by François Chifflart for The Toilers of the Sea by Victor Hugo, although Hugo had originally wanted them to be brush wash drawings, concerned that the resultant wood-engravings would not match the spirit of his writing. After seeing samples, he was convinced and changed his mind.

The output of Méaulle's studio was large, but of an uneven quality. The bulk of his work involved covers for the illustrated supplement to Le Petit Journal, most of them designed by Henri Meyer. He also produced large double-paged supplements and worked for the French newspapers Le Journal Illustré and Le Monde Illustré.

As a writer, he published books on art, children's books and juvenile fiction, some illustrated by other artists.

Gallery

Selected works  
 Messieurs et Mesdemoiselles Bébé, carnets d’un papa, Ducrocq, 1887
 Le Robinson des Airs (an imaginary voyage), Ducrocq, 1889
 Délaissée, A. Mame et fils, 1898
 Victor Hugo, 1802–1902, ouvrage pour la jeunesse, Société Française d'Éditions d'Art, 1902

Further reading 
 Rémi Blachon, La gravure sur bois au XIXe siècle: l'âge du bois debout, Éditions de l'Amateur, 2001

References

External links

 Fortuné Méaulle: Sources and references @ Data.bnf.fr
 

1844 births
1916 deaths
19th-century French male writers
French wood engravers
People from Angers